Clearwater is an unincorporated community recognized as a local urban district in south central Manitoba, Canada. It is located in the Municipality of Louise. It plays host to the Harvest Moon Festival each September, a music and organic farming event.  Clearwater is also the site of an annual July 1 Canada Day baseball tournament.

Transportation
The community has access to other towns in Manitoba via MB Provincial Highways 3A and 342. The community has access to Winnipeg via Highways 3A and 3.

Notable people
Mary Riter Hamilton, painter who was raised in Clearwater.

See also
List of regions of Manitoba
List of rural municipalities in Manitoba

References

Local urban districts in Manitoba